Blue Gene is an album by saxophonist Gene Ammons recorded in 1958 and released on the Prestige label.

Reception
The AllMusic reviewer Scott Yanow stated: "The final of his series of jam sessions for Prestige features an excellent septet... Few surprises occur but everyone plays up to their usual high level".

Track listing 
All compositions by Mal Waldron.
 "Blue Gene" – 13:54     
 "Scamperin'" – 8:46     
 "Blue Greens and Beans" – 9:00     
 "Hip Tip" – 8:55

Personnel 
Gene Ammons – tenor saxophone
Idrees Sulieman – trumpet
Pepper Adams – baritone saxophone 
Mal Waldron – piano
Doug Watkins – bass
Art Taylor – drums
Ray Barretto – congas

References 

Gene Ammons albums
1958 albums
Prestige Records albums
Albums recorded at Van Gelder Studio
Albums produced by Bob Weinstock